Ružica Sokić and Srna Lango departed the cast at the end of the season.

Plot

Ivan Bekjarev departed main cast at the end of the third season. He will return to main cast at the beginning of the fifth season. Ružica Sokić and Srna Lango departed main cast at the end of the season. Costume designer is changed. Irena Belojica replaced Jasmina Sanader.

Cast

Episodes

Jelena (TV series)